Jack Nelson (October 15, 1882 – November 10, 1948) was an American actor and film director of the silent era. He appeared in more than 80 films between 1910 and 1935. He also directed 58 films between 1920 and 1935. He was born in Memphis, Tennessee and died in North Bay, Ontario, Canada.

Biography
Upon arriving in North Bay, Nelson took over management of the Capital Theatre, one of two movie theatres in North Bay at the time. Years later after World War Two broke out, Nelson played an important role in the nine national Victory Loan Drives (1941–1945). Acting as chairman of public relations, Nelson served on the Nipissing District National War Finance Committee. His duties included organizing parades, corresponding with the local North Bay Daily Nugget Newspaper, and hosting occasional free movie admission nights for residents who purchased bonds. During the Sixth Victory Loan Drive in May 1944, Nelson and his employees at the Capital Theatre were awarded a coveted flag on behalf of the National War Finance Committee in Ottawa. The entire staff at the theatre, under Nelson's management, had subscribed 15% their payroll during the four-week drive. In accordance with the Sixth Victory Loan drive promotions, any company within Canada that subscribed 15% of payroll finances to bond purchases were awarded the Victory Loan V-Flag in recognition. The V-Flag was subsequently hung in the lobby of the Capital Theatre.

Selected filmography

 If My Country Should Call (1916)
 Undine (1916)
 Pasquale (1916)
 A Jewel in Pawn (1917)
 The Spotted Lily (1917)
 The Lash of Power (1917)
 The Flash of Fate (1918)
 Winner Takes All (1918)
 When Do We Eat? (1918)
 The Haunted Bedroom (1919)
 Love Madness (1920)
 I Am Guilty (1921)
 Rough Riding Romance (1924)
 The Covered Trail (1924)
 Battling Mason (1924)
 Midnight Secrets (1924)
 A Fighting Heart (1924)
 After a Million (1924)
 The Wall Street Whiz (1925)
 He Who Laughs Last (1925)
 The Mysterious Stranger (1925)
 Sunshine of Paradise Alley (1926)
 Hair-Trigger Baxter (1926)
 The Valley of Bravery (1926)
 The Mile-a-Minute Man (1926)
 The Devil's Gulch (1926)
 The Dead Line (1926)
 The Call of the Wilderness (1926)
 Beyond the Rockies (1926)
 Say It with Diamonds (1927)
 Life of an Actress (1927)
 The Fighting Hombre (1927)
 Bulldog Pluck (1927)
 The Shamrock and the Rose (1927)
 Tarzan the Mighty (1928)
 The Diamond Master (1929)
 Two-Gun Caballero (1931)

References

External links

1882 births
1948 deaths
American male film actors
American male silent film actors
American film directors
20th-century American male actors
Male actors from Memphis, Tennessee